"Forever" is the debut single by Japanese band Ykiki Beat, from their debut LP When the World is Wide, released initially on June 5, 2014 as a digital single. It was re-released on May 18, 2016 as a 12-inch single with another remix tracks.

Track listing

Chart history

Weekly charts

Original release

12-inch re-release

References 

2014 singles
2014 songs
Japanese rock songs